John Denis Browne (1798 – 21 May 1862) was an Irish politician.

The fourth son of Denis Browne, John lived at Mount Browne in County Mayo, and was related to the Marquess of Sligo.  He stood in the 1831 UK general election in County Mayo, and was elected for the Whigs.  He held the seat in the 1832 UK general elections, but was defeated in 1835.

References

1798 births
1862 deaths
Members of the Parliament of the United Kingdom for County Mayo constituencies (1801–1922)
People from County Mayo
UK MPs 1831–1832
UK MPs 1832–1835
Whig (British political party) MPs for Irish constituencies